This page lists notable faculty (past and present) of the University of California, Davis.

Arts and music

Biological sciences

Chemistry

Communications and media 
 Charles Berger, professor of communication

Earth sciences

Economics

Engineering

English

Food sciences

History

Law and government

Mathematics

Medicine

Physics

Social sciences, sociology, anthropology, and cultural studies

Other

See also
 List of University of California, Davis alumni

References

External links
 UC Davis Faculty on the Davis Wiki

Davis faculty